Aliabad (also Romanized as ‘Alīābād; also known as ‘Alīābād-e Bālā and Deh Bālā) is a village in Bahreman Rural District, Nuq District, Rafsanjan County, Kerman Province, Iran. At the 2006 census, its population was 102, in 23 families.

References 

Populated places in Rafsanjan County